Cut-resistant fabrics are those that can withstand slashing or cutting action.These textile products protect the wearer from accidents and occupational hazards. Metallic materials, Para aramid, high-modulus polyethylene materials and high density structure materials are used in the manufacturing of cut resistant textiles. Cut-resistant fabrics have various applications in mechanical protection for the wearer. They are used for protective wear in aprons and gloves for chefs, military use, the construction industry, forest use in trimming trees, etc

Cut resistance 
Cut resistance has many dimensions such as force, direction, sharpness of the blade, length of the cut and flexibility of object. Different products should be evaluated in relation to the expected type of cut risk and environment that they are expected to face.

Cut-resistant gloves 

In personal protective equipment (PPE), cut-resistant gloves are those designed to protect the wearer's hands from cuts while working with sharp tools. They can be divided into metal mesh gloves, cut-and-sewn, and seamless knitted gloves.

Metal mesh gloves are a form of chainmail, and are made of rings of stainless steel. They are typically used in food applications.

Cut-and-sewn gloves can be made using a cut-resistant material or by using conventional materials with full or palm lining of cut-resistant materials. The materials are cut to shape and sewn into a glove.

Seamless knitted gloves are knitted in one piece by a flat knitting machine. The cut protection is provided by high performance materials such as para-aramid (Twaron, Kevlar), high performance polyethylene (HPPE) (Dyneema, Spectra), special polyvinyl acetate (PVA) yarns (SupraBlock) or steel wire and fiberglass yarns. Knitting machines are commonly classified using gauge, and can range from 7 gauge all the way through 18 and 21 gauge.  The gloves are often coated with solid or foamed latex, nitrile or polyurethane.

SuperFabric 

SuperFabric is a branded cut-resistant fabric.

Standards 
One method of evaluating cut resistance is the EN 388:2016 standard, or "coup" test. EN388 uses a circular rotating blade of 40mm diameter that rotates against the direction of movement. The blade is moving back and forth over a small distance of about 50mm with a load of 5N. The numbers of cut cycles are recorded and compared to a cotton control fabric. A cut resistance index is calculated between "0" and "5" depending on the average number of cycles prior to break-through failure: "0" means 0 to 1.2 cycles;  "1" means >1.2 to 2.5 cycles;  "2" means >2.5 to 5.0 cycles;  "3" means >5.0 to 10.0 cycles;  "4" means >10.0 to 20.0 cycles; and "5" means >20.0 cycles.

EN 388 was updated in 2016, and one significant change is the introduction of ISO 13997:1999. EN 388:2016 incorporates a letter A-F to indicate the cut resistance of A<2N, B<5N, C<10N, D<15N, E<22N and F<30N. This is more in line with the new North American standard of ANSI/ISEA 105-2016 that is using a system of A1-A9 cut levels.

ASTM F2992-15 is similar to ISO 13997:1999 in that the test is carried out on a tomodynamometer (or TDM).  A cutting edge (usually a razor blade) under a specified load is moved across a sample material.  When the blade cuts through the material, the cut-through distance is calculated.  This test is repeated with different loads to determine the calculated cutting load for the sample material.  The result is compared to the levels outlined in ANSI/ISEA 105-2016, and the ANSI Cut Level is determined.

See also
Puncture resistance
Ultra-high-molecular-weight polyethylene

References

External links 
 Video on Cut Resistant Gloves and what the EN388 Rating Means
 Guide to the EN388 Standard
 Updated ANSI Standards
 Updated EN 388 Standard
EN388 Expert Guide
Review on Cut Resistant Gloves

Gloves
Protective gear